Datcu is a surname. Notable people with the surname include:

Ilie Datcu (born 1937), Romanian footballer and coach
Mihai Datcu, German engineer

Romanian-language surnames